Vishwanath Shastri was an Indian politician. He was elected to the Lok Sabha (1991–1996), the lower house of the Parliament of India, as a member of the Communist Party of India.

References

External links
Official biographical sketch in Parliament of India website

India MPs 1991–1996
Lok Sabha members from Uttar Pradesh
1945 births
Living people
Communist Party of India politicians from Uttar Pradesh